Aimée Delamain (21 April 1906 – 18 June 1999) was an English actress, known for spending most of her career playing elderly ladies.

Biography 

Her father, Colonel Frank Delamain was a member of King Edward XI's Bengal Lancers. Upon his retirement in 1909, the family moved to Lamberhurst, Kent. Tragedy struck in 1915 when Aimée's mother Mabel (née Bullock) died of rheumatic fever and the following year her elder brother Frank Gun Delamain was killed in action at the Battle of the Somme.

Brought up by relatives, she expressed a desire to act and in 1931, she graduated from RADA. This was followed by playing in the provinces but when the Second World War broke out, Aimée worked as a nurse with the Voluntary Aid Detachment, later playing in an ENSA company.

Theatre roles soon followed, as did film and television work, the actress being a popular choice among directors for portraying old ladies. One such director was Peter Moffatt. According to The Two Doctors DVD commentary, they had known each other since 1945 when they were both members of the same repertory company. Subsequently, he often cast her in several of his productions.

Never married, Delamain moved into Denville Hall, the retirement home for actors in February 1991, retiring from acting not long afterwards. There, she spent her final years and indulged in a life-long passion for gardening.

Selected filmography

Film

 Little Red Monkey (1955) - Mrs. Henley (Dr. Barnes's Housekeeper) (uncredited)
 The Secret (1955) - Miss Lyons
 Two Left Feet (1963) - Auntie (uncredited)
 Rotten to the Core (1965) - Lady Greville (uncredited)
 The Raging Moon (1971) - Alice
 I, Monster (1971) - Landlady
 The Amazing Mr. Blunden (1972) - Elsie Tucker
 The House in Nightmare Park (1973) - Mother
 One of Our Dinosaurs Is Missing (1975) - Millicent
 Who Is Killing the Great Chefs of Europe? a.k.a. Too Many Cooks (1978) - Old Woman
 Oxford Blues (1984) - Lady Bemore
 Santa Claus: The Movie (1985) - Storyteller
 High Spirits (1988) - Great Granny Plunkett
 Getting It Right (1989) - Mrs. Arbuthnot

Television

 Sunday Night Theatre (1954-1956) - Dulcie Curtis / Jessica Streatford
 Our Miss Pemberton (1957-1958) - Miss Henrietta Copley
 ITV Play of the Week (1959-1965) - Mrs. Culff / Phyllis / Miss Chancellor
 Theatre 70 (1960) - Beggarwoman
 Dixon of Dock Green (1961-1975) - Mrs. Lane / Matty / Arabella Floyd
 Tales of Mystery (1961-1962) - Aunt Eleanor / Mrs. Malleson
 Boyd Q.C. (1961) - Gladys Westbury
 Oliver Twist (1962) - Old Sally
 Z-Cars (1962) - Woman Customer
 Maigret (1962) - Lisette
 Harpers West One (1962) - Woman Customer
 Suspense (1963) - Aphrodite
 The Avengers (1963-1968) - 1st Lady / Miss Gladys Culpepper
 Emergency Ward 10 (1963) - Miss Edwardes
 Moonstrike (1963) - Farmer's Wife
 The Plane Makers (1964) - Mrs. Milne
 The Odd Man a.k.a. It's Dark Outside (1964) - Maude Rossiter
 The Human Jungle (1964) - Mrs. Oliver
 Hereward the Wake (1965) - Lapp nurse
 The Wednesday Play (1965) - Mrs. Morris
 Pardon the Expression (1966) - Miss Singleton
 No Hiding Place (1966) - Nurse Gibbs
 Thirteen Against Fate (1966) - Mademoiselle Couvert
 The Saint (1966) - Lady Haverstock
 Les Misérables (1967) - Porteress
 ITV Playhouse (1967-1968) - Miss Davidson / Prudence
 Omnibus (1969) - Old Mary
 The Main Chance (1969) - Alice Greensmith
 Softly, Softly (1969) - Mrs. Abbott
 The Root of All Evil? (1969) - Dame Helen Blake
 ITV Sunday Night Theatre (1971) - Mrs. Hubbard
 The Troubleshooters (1971) - Mrs. Izard senior
 The Rivals of Sherlock Holmes (1971) - Mrs. Hisgins
 Upstairs, Downstairs (1971) - Lady Templeton
 The Befrienders (1972) - Mrs. Kenwood
 Owen, M.D. (1973) - Miriam Milton
 Crown Court (1974) - Mrs. Elgar
 The Morecambe & Wise Show (1974) - Miss Tasker
 Thriller (1975) - Penelope
 Beryl's Lot (1975) - Phoebe
 Shadows (1975) - Grandmother
 Angels (1976) - Dodie
 ITV Sunday Night Drama (1976) - Lady Taggart
 The Crezz (1976) - Lady Clarke
 Jackanory (1977) - Storyteller
 Target (1977) - Susan De Veer
 Armchair Thriller (1978) - Mrs. Franklyn
 Oh No It's Selwyn Froggitt (1978) - Mrs. Price
 The Famous Five (1978) - Mrs. Thomas
 George and Mildred (1978-1979) - Old Lady / Patient
 Fawlty Towers (1979) - Mrs. Johnson
 Shoestring (1979) - Anne Appleby
 The Sandbaggers (1980) - Penelope
 BBC2 Playhouse (1981) - Rose
 Chronicle (1982) - Mrs. Brasher
 All for Love (1982) - Miss Bird
 Never the Twain (1982) - Miss Barnes
 The Professionals (1983) - Old Lady
 Shine on Harvey Moon (1984) - Lady
 Doctor Who (1985) - Doña Arana
 One by One (1985) - Miss Rind
 Fresh Fields (1985) - Mrs. Bevin
 C.A.T.S. Eyes (1986) - Mrs. Sitwell
 Screen Two (1987-1992) - Lady Birdstock / Ambulatory Grannie
 The District Nurse (1987) - Emily Rees
 Casualty (1987) - Eugenie
 'Allo 'Allo (1987) - Madame Sabion
 All in Good Faith (1988) - Mrs. Bagley
 Don't Wait Up (1988) - Mrs. Clarke
 Dramarama (1988) - Bookseller
 Wyatt's Watchdogs (1988) - Mary Spencer
 The Bill (1988-1990) - Mrs. West / Pensioner on Bus
 You Rang, M'Lord? (1990) - Aunt Maud
 A Bit of Fry & Laurie (1990) - Customer Service Lady
 Dizzy Heights (1991) - Rose

References

External links 
 
Aimee Delamain at Theatricalia

1906 births
1999 deaths
British stage actresses
British film actresses
British television actresses
20th-century British actresses
Alumni of RADA
British people in colonial India